Wei Yu is a Canadian electrical engineer. He is a professor and Canada Research Chair in Information Theory and Wireless Communication at the University of Toronto. He was elected a Fellow of the Institute of Electrical and Electronics Engineers (IEEE) in 2014 "for contributions to optimization techniques for multiple-input-multiple-output communications". He received his bachelor's degree from the University of Waterloo in 1997, and his Ph.D. in electrical engineering from Stanford University in 2002. He is a Fellow of the Canadian Academy of Engineering.

References

External links

20th-century births
Living people
Canadian electrical engineers
University of Waterloo alumni
Stanford University alumni
Academic staff of the University of Toronto
Fellow Members of the IEEE
Fellows of the Canadian Academy of Engineering
Year of birth missing (living people)
Place of birth missing (living people)